The 1965 NCAA College Division football rankings are from the United Press International poll of College Division head coaches and from the Associated Press. The 1965 NCAA College Division football season was the eighth year UPI published a Coaches Poll in what was termed the "Small College" division. It was the sixth year for the AP version of the poll.

The UPI poll did not include Win/Loss records in the weekly rankings. In the AP poll, the Win/Loss records were published for the Top 10.  However, the Win/Loss records are provided in the UPI poll section if the AP also ranked the team.

Legend

The AP poll

The UPI Coaches poll

Notes

References

Rankings
NCAA College Division football rankings